Maribel Vanessa Caicedo (born April 1, 1998) is an Ecuadorian track and field athlete.

Biography
On July 16, 2015, Maribel Caicedo won a gold medal in the 100 meter hurdles at the IAAF World Youth Championships in Athletics held in Colombia. She is the first Ecuadorian to gain a gold medal at the IAAF World Youth Championships. In 2017, she won a bronze medal at the Bolivarian Games, also in the 100 meter hurdles.

In December 2017, she traveled to Brandenton, Florida in the USA to train under the coach Loren Seagrave. She has also trained under Fátima Navarro.

In May 2018, she broke the previous Ecuadorian record for 100 meter hurdles set by Nancy Vallecilla in 1998, when she reached a time of 13.12 seconds, beating the record time of 13.16 seconds. On the same day, she broke the record once more with a time of 13.01 seconds. With this record, she reached seventh place in the South American ranking. For this, she obtained public recognition from the South America Athletics Confederation.

Caicedo is an evangelical.

References

Living people
1998 births
Sportspeople from Guayaquil
Ecuadorian female hurdlers
Afro-Ecuadorian
Athletes (track and field) at the 2019 Pan American Games
Pan American Games competitors for Ecuador
21st-century Ecuadorian women